Duane Stephen Long (born January 31, 1960), also known as D. Stephen Long, is the Cary M. Maguire University Professor of Ethics at Southern Methodist University. Previously, Long was Professor of Systematic Theology at Marquette University. He specializes in systematic theology, Christian ethics, and political theology. His books include The Divine Economy: Theology and Market, which details a Christian approach to economics based in the thought of radical orthodoxy, The Goodness of God: Theology, Church and Social Order and Christian Ethics: A Very Short Introduction.

References

External links
 D. Stephen Long Southern Methodist University faculty webpage
 D. Stephen Long Marquette faculty webpage
 D. Stephen Long (Theopedia)

American Christian theologians
Duke University alumni
Living people
Systematic theologians
1960 births
Political theologians